"When You Love Someone" is a song recorded by American country music artist Sammy Kershaw.  It was released in August 1999 as the second single from the album Maybe Not Tonight.  The song reached #37 on the Billboard Hot Country Singles & Tracks chart.  The song was written by Keith Stegall and Dan Hill.

Chart performance

References

1999 singles
1999 songs
Sammy Kershaw songs
Songs written by Dan Hill
Songs written by Keith Stegall
Song recordings produced by Keith Stegall
Mercury Records singles